The Kentucky Wildcats college football team represents the University of Kentucky in the East Division of the Southeastern Conference (SEC). The Wildcats compete as part of the NCAA Division I Football Bowl Subdivision. The program has had 37 head coaches since it began play during the 1881 season. On November 27, 2012, Mark Stoops was introduced as Kentucky's 37th head coach.

The team has played more than 1,150 games over 122 seasons of Kentucky football. Both the inaugural 1881 squad and the revived 1891 squad have unknown coaches according to university records in winning two games and losing three. Since 1892, eight coaches have led the Wildcats in postseason bowl games: Bear Bryant, Fran Curci, Jerry Claiborne, Bill Curry, Hal Mumme, Rich Brooks, Joker Phillips and Mark Stoops.

Two of those coaches also won conference championships: Bryant and Curci won a combined three as a member of the SEC.

Curci is the leader in seasons coached with nine. Bryant is the leader in games won, with 60 victories during his eight seasons with the program. Jack Wright has the highest winning percentage of those who have coached more than one game, with .875. Bernie Shively has the lowest winning percentage of those who have coached more than one game, with .200. Of the 36 different head coaches who have led the Wildcats, Bryant and Jerry Claiborne have been inducted into the College Football Hall of Fame in South Bend, Indiana.

Key

Coaches

Notes

References 
General

 
 

Specific

Lists of college football head coaches

Kentucky sports-related lists